Randy is a given name, popular in the United States and Canada. It is primarily a masculine name. It was originally derived from the names Randall, Randolf, Randolph, as well as Bertrand and Andrew, and may be a short form (hypocorism) of them.

Randi is approximately the feminine equivalent of Randy.

People with the given name

A
Randy Abbey (born 1974), Ghanaian media personality
Randy Adler (??–2016), American bishop
Randy Albelda (born 1955), American economist
Randy Allen (disambiguation), multiple people
Randy Ambrosie (born 1963), Canadian sports executive
Randy Anderson (1959–2002), American wrestling referee
Randy Angst, American politician
Randy Armstrong (disambiguation), multiple people
Randy Arozarena (born 1995), Cuban baseball player
Randy Asadoor (born 1962), American baseball player
Randy Atcher (1918–2002), American television personality
Randy Avent, American electrical engineer
Randy Avon (born 1940), American politician
Randy Awrey (born 1956), American football coach
Randy Ayers (born 1956), American basketball coach

B
Randy Babbitt (born 1946), American businessman and politician
Randy Bachman (born 1943), Canadian musician
Randy Baker (born 1958), American stock car racer
Randy Baldwin (born 1967), American football player
Randy Ball (born 1951), American football coach
Randy Barceló (1946–1994), Cuban dancer
Randy Barlow (1943–2020), American singer
Randy Barnes (born 1966), American shot putter
Randy Barnett (born 1952), American lawyer
Randy Barth, American educational entrepreneur
Randy Bartz (born 1968), American speed skater
Randy Baruh (born 1995), Malaysian footballer
Randy Bates (born 1960), American football coach
Randy Baumann (born 1972), American radio personality
Randy Baumgardner (born 1956), American politician
Randy Beisler (born 1944), American football player
Randy Bell, American musician
Randy Bennett (disambiguation), multiple people
Randy Bernard (born 1967), American race car manager
Randy Bernsen (born 1954), American guitarist
Randy W. Berry (born 1965), American diplomat
Randy Best, American entrepreneur
Randy Bettis (born 1959), American disc jockey
Randy Beverly (born 1944), American football player
Randy Beverly Jr. (born 1966), American football coach
Randy Bish, American cartoonist
Randy Black (born 1963), Canadian rock drummer
Randy Blair, American actor
Randy Blake (born 1986), American kickboxer
Randy Bloom (born 1955), American painter
Randy Blumer (born 1958), American poker player
Randy Blythe (born 1971), American singer-songwriter
Randy Bobb (1948–1982), American baseball player
Randy Bockus (born 1960), American baseball player
Randy Boehning (born 1962), American politician
Randy Boissonnault (born 1970), Canadian politician
Randy Bolden (born 1976), American basketball coach
Randy Boone (born 1942), American actor
Randy Borum, American professor
Randy L. Bott (born 1945), American religious professor
Randy Boudreaux, American songwriter
Randy Boyagoda (born 1976), Canadian writer
Randy Boyd (disambiguation), multiple people
Randy Bradbury (born 1964), American guitarist
Randy Brecker (born 1945), American musician
Randy Breuer (born 1960), American basketball player
Randy Bridges, American politician
Randy Briggs (born 1965), American stock car racer
Randy Brinson (born 1957), American physician
Randy Brock (born 1943), American politician
Randy Brodehl (born 1954), American businessman
Randy Brooks (disambiguation), multiple people
Randy Brown (disambiguation), multiple people
Randy Bryce (born 1964), American ironworker
Randy Bryden (born 1970), Canadian curler
Randy Buckner (born 1970), American neuroscientist
Randy Bucyk (born 1962), Canadian ice hockey player
Randy Buehler (born 1971), American video game developer
Randy Bullock (born 1989), American football player
Randy Burchell (born 1955), Canadian ice hockey player
Randy Burckhard (born 1952), American politician
Randy Burke (born 1955), American football player
Randy Burns (born 1948), American singer-songwriter
Randy Burridge (born 1966), Canadian ice hockey player
Randy Bush (born 1958), American baseball player
Randy Bush (scientist), American scientist
Randy Byers (born 1964), American baseball player

C
Randy Caballero (born 1990), Nicaraguan-American boxer
Randy Cain (1945–2009), American singer
Randy California (1951–1997), American guitarist
Randy Campbell (born 1960), American football player
Randy Carlyle (born 1956), Canadian ice hockey player and coach
Randy Carr (1956–2002), American musician
Randy Cartwright (born 1951), American animator
Randy Cassingham (born 1959), American columnist
Randy Castillo (1950–2002), American drummer
Randy Castillo (dancer) (born 1982), American ballet dancer
Randy Chartier (born 1957), American horse trainer
Randy Chestnut (born 1971), American comedian
Randy Chevrier (born 1976), Canadian football player
Randy Chirino (born 1996), Costa Rican footballer
Randy Choate (born 1975), American baseball player
Randy Churchill (born 1960), Canadian stock car racer
Randy Ciarlante, American musician
Randy Clark (disambiguation), multiple people
Randy Clay (1928–2006), American football player
Randy Cohen, American writer
Randy Collins (born 2001), Japanese fashion designer
Randy W. Collins (born 1946), Canadian pharmacist
Randy Cooper (born 1967), American guitarist
Randy Corman (born 1960), American politician
Randy Cornor (born 1954), American singer
Randy Costa (born 1994), American mixed martial artist
Randy Couture (born 1963), American mixed martial artist
Randy Crane (born 1965), American judge
Randy Crawford (born 1952), American singer
Randy Crawford (tennis) (born 1955), American tennis player
Randy Credico (born 1954), American activist
Randy B. Crites (born 1962), American naval officer
Randy Cross (born 1954), American football player
Randy Crouch (born 1952), American instrumentalist
Randy Crowder (born 1952), American football player
Randy Culpepper (born 1989), American basketball player
Randy Cunneyworth (born 1961), Canadian ice hockey player
Randy Cuthbert (born 1970), American football player
Randy Lee Cutler, Canadian academic

D
Randy Daniels (born 1950), American businessman and politician
Randy Darling (born 1957), American curler
Randy David (born 1956), Filipino journalist
Randy Davis (born 1952), American politician
Randy Dean (born 1955), American football player
Randy DeBarge (born 1958), American musician
Randy Dedini (born 1970), American soccer player
Randy Degg (born 1984), American football player
Randy Dellosa, Filipino psychologist
Randy Delorey, Canadian politician
Randy Demmer (born 1957), American politician
Randy Denton (born 1949), American basketball player
Randy de Puniet (born 1981), French motorcycle racer
Randy Dickens, American football coach
Randy Dickison (??–1996), American diver
Randy Dixon (born 1965), American football player
Randy Dobnak (born 1995), American baseball player
Randy Dorman, American Paralympic athlete
Randy Dorn (born 1953), American politician
Randy Dorton (1954–2004), American engine builder
Randy Druz (born 1958), American tennis player
Randy DuBurke (born 1962), American illustrator
Randy Duck (born 1975), American basketball player
Randy Duncan (born 1937), American football player and lawyer
Randy Dunn, American academic administrator
Randy D. Dunn, American politician
Randy Dutiaume, Canadian curler
Randy Dwumfour (born 2000), Ghanaian footballer

E
Randy Edelman (born 1947), American musician
Randy Edmunds (disambiguation), multiple people
Randy Edsall (born 1958), American football coach
Randy Edwards (born 1961), American football player
Randy Edwini-Bonsu (born 1990), Canadian soccer player
Randy Elliott (born 1951), American baseball player
Randy Ellis, Canadian engineer
Randy Emberlin, American illustrator
Randy Charles Epping (born 1952), American author
Randy Espinosa (born 1988), Guatemalan footballer
Randy Evans (born 1958), American lawyer
Randy Ewers (born 1968), American politician
Randy Exelby (born 1965), Canadian ice hockey player

F
Randy Fabi (born 1963), Canadian football player
Randy Falco (born 1953), American media executive
Randy Farmer (born 1961), American game developer
Randy Fasani (born 1978), American football player
Randy Feenstra (born 1969), American politician
Randy Fenoli (born 1964), American television presenter
Randy Fichtner (born 1963), American football coach
Randy Fine (born 1974), American politician
Randy Fischer (born 1951), American politician
Randy Fontanez (born 1989), American baseball player
Randy Forbes (born 1952), American politician
Randy Foye (born 1983), American basketball player
Randy Flanagan (born 1960), Canadian neuroscientist
Randy Flores (born 1975), American baseball player and scout
Randy Florke, American real estate agent
Randy Freer (born 1959/1960), American television executive
Randy Frese, American politician
Randy Friese (born 1964), American politician
Randy Frye (born 1955), American politician
Randy Fuller (disambiguation), multiple people
Randy Fullmer (born 1950), American businessman

G
Randy Paul Gage (born 1959), American author
Randy Galloway (born 1943), American sports columnist
Randy Gambill, American actor
Randy Gane (born 1959), American keyboardist
Randy Garber (disambiguation), multiple people
Randy Gardner (disambiguation), multiple people
Randy Gatewood (born 1973), American football player
Randy Gay (born 1958), American serial killer
Randy Gazzola (born 1993), Canadian ice hockey player
Randy Gelispie, American percussionist
Randy George (born 1964), American army lieutenant general
Randy Gilhen (born 1963), German-Canadian ice hockey player
Randy Gingera (born 1968), Canadian volleyball player
Randy Givens (born 1962), American track and field athlete
Randy Glasbergen (1957–2015), American cartoonist
Randy Glass, American con man
Randy Glover (born 1941), American golfer
Randy Gomez (born 1957), American baseball player
Randy Goodrum (born 1947), American songwriter
Randy J. Goodwin (born 1967), American actor
Randy Gordon (disambiguation), multiple people
Randy Gradishar (born 1952), American football player
Randy Graf (born 1957), American politician
Randy Graff (born 1955), American actress
Randy Grau (born 1975), American politician
Randy Greenawalt (1949–1997), American serial killer
Randy Gregg (disambiguation), multiple people
Randy Gregory (born 1992), American football player
Randy Gregson (1918–2010), American tennis player
Randy Greif (born 1957), American composer
Randy Griffin (born 1976), American boxer
Randy Grimes (born 1960), American football player
Randy Gross, American politician
Randy Grossman (born 1952), American football player
Randy Gumpert (1918–2008), American baseball player
Randy Guss (born 1967), American musician

H
Randy Hahn (born 1958), American sports commentator
Randy Halasan (born 1982), Filipino teacher
Randy Halberstadt (born 1953), American pianist
Randy Hall (born 1960), American singer
Randy Hansen (born 1954), American guitarist
Randy Hanson (born 1968), American football coach
Randy Harrison (born 1977), American actor
Randy Hart (born 1948), American football player and coach
Randy Hawes (born 1947), Canadian politician
Randy Haykin, American entrepreneur
Randy Heath (born 1964), Canadian ice hockey player
Randy Heckenkemper (born 1958), American golf course architect
Randy Hedberg (born 1954), American football coach
Randy Heflin (1918–1999), American baseball player
Randy Heisler (born 1961), American discus thrower
Randy Henderson, American writer
Randy Henderson (politician) (born 1956), American politician
Randy Hendricks (born 1945), American attorney
Randy Hill (born 1967), American entrepreneur
Randy Hilliard (born 1967), American football player
Randy Hillier (politician) (born 1958), Canadian politician
Randy Hillier (ice hockey) (born 1960), Canadian ice hockey player
Randy Hippeard (born 1985), American football player
Randy Hoback (born 1967), Canadian politician
Randy Jo Hobbs (1948–1993), American musician
Randy Hoffman (born 1952), American athletic administrator
Randy Hogan (disambiguation), multiple people
Randy Holcomb (born 1979), Libyan-American basketball player
Randy Holden (born 1945), American guitarist
Randy Holland (born 1951), Canadian poker player
Randy J. Holland (1947–2022), American judge
Randy Holloway (born 1955), American football player
Randy Holt (born 1953), Canadian ice hockey player
Randy Hood (born 1968), American baseball coach
Randy Hopper (born 1966), American politician
Randy Horton (born 1945), American soccer player
Randy Houser (born 1975), American singer-songwriter
Randy Howard (disambiguation), multiple people
Randy Hughes (born 1953), American football player
Randy Hultgren (born 1966), American politician
Randy Hundley (born 1942), American baseball player
Randy Hunt (disambiguation), multiple people
Randy Hutchison (born 1948), American stock car racer
Randy Hymes (born 1979), American football player

I
Randy Ireland (born 1957), Canadian ice hockey player
Randy Iwase (born 1947), American politician

J
Randy Jackson (disambiguation), multiple people
Randy Jayne (born 1944), American military officer
Randy Jessup (born 1960/1961), American politician
Randy Johnson (disambiguation), multiple people
Randy Johnston (disambiguation), multiple people
Randy Jones (disambiguation), multiple people
Randy Jordan (born 1970), American football player and coach
Randy Josselyn (born 1974), American actor
Randy Jirtle (born 1947), American biologist
Randy Jurgensen (born 1933), American detective

K
Randy Kamp (born 1953), Canadian politician
Randy P. Kamrath (born 1954), American politician
Randy Kaplan, American songwriter
Randy Karraker (born 1962), American sportscaster
Randy Katz, American professor
Randy Kehler (born 1944), American activist
Randy Keisler (born 1976), American baseball player
Randy Kelly (born 1950), American politician
Randy Kendrick, American political activist
Randy Kerber (born 1958), American composer
Randy Kerbow (born 1940), American football player
Randy Kinder (born 1975), American football player
Randy Kirk (born 1964), American football player
Randy Kirner (born 1946), American politician
Randy Klein (born 1949), American musician
Randy Knorr (born 1968), American baseball player
Randy Kohrs, American instrumentalist
Randy Komisar, American attorney
Randy Kraft (born 1945), American serial killer
Randy Kramer (born 1960), American baseball player
Randy Krummenacher (born 1990), Swiss motorcycle racer
Randy Kuhl (born 1943), American politician
Randy Kutcher (born 1960), American baseball player

L
Randy Ladouceur (born 1960), Canadian ice hockey player and coach
Randy Laine (born 1952), American surfer
Randy LaJoie (born 1961), American race car driver
Randy Lane (born 1967), American artistic gymnast
Randy Lanier (born 1954), American race car driver
Randy LaPolla, Australian researcher
Randy Laverty (born 1953), American politician
Randy Law, American politician
Randy Leen (born 1975), American golfer
Randy Legge (born 1945), Canadian ice hockey player
Randy Lemm, American politician
Randy Lennox, Canadian media executive
Randy Leonard (born 1952), American politician
Randy Lerch (born 1954), American baseball player
Randy Lerner (born 1962), American investor
Randy Lerú (born 1995), Cuban artistic gymnast
Randy Levine (born 1955), American attorney
Randy Lew (born 1985), American poker player
Randy Lewis (disambiguation), multiple people
Randy Ligon, American politician
Randy Lipscher (born 1960), American ice hockey player
Randy Livingston (born 1975), American basketball player
Randy Logan (born 1951), American football player
Randy Love (born 1956), American football player
Randy Lyness (born 1951), American politician

M
Randy MacDonald (born 1962), Canadian stock car racer
Randy MacGregor (born 1953), Canadian ice hockey player
Randy L. Maddox (born 1953), American theologian
Randy Maggard (born 1963), American politician
Randy Mamola (born 1959), American motorcycle racer
Randy Manery (born 1949), Canadian ice hockey player
Randy Mann, American soccer player
Randy Marsh (1949–2008), American baseball umpire
Randy Marshall (born 1946), American football player
Randy Martin (1957–2015), American art professor
Randy Martz (born 1956), American baseball player
Randy Matson (born 1945), American track and field athlete
Randy Matthews (born 1950), American singer
Randy Mattingly (born 1951), American football player
Randy Mavinga (born 2000), French footballer
Randy Mazey (born 1966), American baseball coach
Randy McAllister, American drummer
Randy McCown (born 1977), American football player
Randy McDaniel (born 1967), American politician
Randy McEachern (born 1955), American football player
Randy McGilberry (born 1980), American baseball player
Randy McKay (born 1967), Canadian ice hockey player
Randy McKellar (1962–1999), Canadian rugby union player
Randy McMichael (born 1979), American football player
Randy McMillan (born 1958), American football player
Randy McNally (born 1944), American politician
Randy Mearns (born 1969), American lacrosse player
Randy Meier, American news anchor
Randy Meisner (born 1946), American musician
Randy Melvin (born 1959), American football coach
Randy Merkel (born 1976), American soccer player
Randy Merrill, American engineer
Randy Merriman (1911–2005), American television producer
Randy Messenger (born 1981), American baseball player
Randy Susan Meyers (born 1952), American author
Randy Miller (disambiguation), multiple people
Randy Milligan (born 1961), American baseball player
Randy Minchew (born 1957), American politician
Randy Minkoff, American corporate executive
Randy Minniear (born 1943), American football player
Randy Mitton (born 1950), Canadian ice hockey player
Randy Moffett (born 1947), American academic administrator
Randy Moffitt (born 1948), American baseball player
Randy Moller (born 1963), Canadian ice hockey player
Randy Monroe (born 1962), American basketball coach
Randy Montana (born 1985), American singer
Randy Montgomery (born 1947), American football player
Randy Charles Morin (born 1969), Canadian author
Randy Moss (born 1977), American football player
Randy Murray, Canadian guitarist
Randy Murray (ice hockey) (born 1945), Canadian ice hockey player
Randy Myers (disambiguation), multiple people

N
Randy J. Nelson, American neuroscientist
Randy Neufeld (curler) (born 1962), Canadian curler
Randy Neugebauer (born 1949), American politician
Randy Neumann (born 1948), American boxer
Randy Newman (born 1943), American singer-songwriter
Randy Niemann (born 1955), American baseball player and coach
Randy Nix (born 1956), American politician
Randy Nixon (born 1960), American tennis player
Randy Norton, American basketball coach
Randy Nosek (born 1967), American baseball player
Randy Nteka (born 1997), French footballer

O
Randy Emeka Obi (born 1999), Japanese footballer
Randy Oda (born 1953), American musician
Randy Oglesby (born 1949), American actor
Randy Olson (born 1955), American biologist
Randy Onuoha (born 1994), Dutch footballer
Randy Orton (born 1980), American professional wrestler
Randy Osburn (born 1952), Canadian ice hockey player
Randy Owen (born 1949), American singer
Randy Owens (1959–2015), American basketball player

Q
Randy Quaid (born 1950), American actor

P
Randy Padilla (born 1991), Belizean footballer
Randy Palmer (born 1975), American football player
Randy Pangalila (born 1990), Indonesian actor
Randy Parsons (born 1965), American instrument maker
Randy Parton (1953–2021), American singer-songwriter
Randy Pausch (1960–2008), American computer scientist
Randy Pedersen (born 1962), American bowler
Randy Peele (born 1957), American basketball coach
Randy Petalcorin (born 1991), Filipino boxer
Randy Pettapiece (born 1949), Canadian politician
Randy Pfund (born 1951), American basketball coach
Randy Phillips (disambiguation), multiple people
Randy Pierce (disambiguation), multiple people
Randy Pietzman (born 1961), American politician
Randy Pike (1953–2014), American politician
Randy Pikuzinski (born 1965), American soccer player
Randy Piper (born 1953), American guitarist
Randy Pippin (born 1963), American football coach
Randy Pitchford (born 1971), American businessman
Randy Pobst (born 1957), American race car driver
Randy Poffo (1952–2011), American professional wrestler
Randy Poltl (born 1952), American football player
Randy Porter (born 1964), American stock car racer
Randy Post (born 1968), American illustrator
Randy Powell (born 1950), American writer
Randy Powell (politician), American politician
Randy Prescott (born 1964), American soccer player
Randy Price (born 1957), American politician
Randy Primas (1949–2012), American politician

R
Randy Ragan (born 1959), Canadian soccer player
Randy Railsback, American politician
Randy Rainbow (born 1981), American comedian
Randy Raine-Reusch (born 1952), Canadian composer
Randy Rampage (1960–2018), Canadian musician
Randy Ramsey (born 1995), American football player
Randy Randleman (born 1954), American politician
Randy Rasmussen (disambiguation), multiple people
Randy Read (born 1957), Canadian researcher
Randy Ready (born 1960), American baseball player and coach
Randy Redroad, American filmmaker
Randy Reese (born 1946), American swimming coach
Randy Reeves (born 1962), American military officer
Randy Reinholz (born 1961), American native playwright
Randy Renfrow (born 1958), American race car driver
Randy Reutershan (born 1955), American football player
Randy Revelle (1941–2018), American politician
Randy Rhino (born 1953), American football player
Randy Rieman, American poet
Randy Ribay, American writer
Randy Rich (born 1953), American football player
Randy Richards (born 1991), Jamaican-American football player
Randy Richardville (born 1959), American politician
Randy Rigby, American basketball executive
Randy Rinks (born 1954), American businessman
Randy Rhoads (1956–1982), American guitarist
Randy Roach, American politician
Randy Robbins (disambiguation), multiple people
Randy Robertson (politician) (born 1962), American politician
Randy Robitaille (born 1975), Canadian hockey player
Randy Rogers (football manager), Bahamian football manager
Randy Romero (1957–2019), American jockey
Randy Rosario (born 1994), Dominican baseball player
Randy Rose (born 1956), American professional wrestler
Randy Rose (musician), American musician
Randy Rota (born 1950), Canadian ice hockey player
Randy Roth (born 1954), American convicted murderer
Randy Roth (ice hockey) (born 1952), Canadian ice hockey player
Randy Rowe (born 1980), Canadian ice hockey player
Randy Ruiz (born 1977), American baseball player
Randy Rushing, American politician
Randy Rustenberg (born 1984), Dutch footballer
Randy Rutherford (born 1971), American basketball coach
Randy Ryan, American actor

S
Randy Saaf, American gaming executive
Randy Sabien (born 1956), American violinist
Randy Sageman (born 1960), Canadian diver
Randy Salerno (1963–2008), American news anchor
Randy Samuel (born 1963), Trinidadian-Canadian soccer player
Randy Sanders (born 1965), American football coach
Randy Sandke (born 1949), American trumpeter
Randy Santana (born 1983), Mexican footballer
Randy Santiago (born 1960), Filipino actor
Randy Savage (1952–2011), American professional wrestler
Randy Scarbery (born 1952), American baseball player
Randy Scheunemann (born 1960), American lobbyist
Randy Schleusener (born 1957), American football player
Randy Schneider (born 2001), Swiss footballer
Randy Schobinger (born 1969), American politician
Randy Schultz (1943–1996), American football player
Randy Schwartz (born 1944), American baseball player
Randy Scott (disambiguation), multiple people
Randy Scruggs (1953–2018), American music producer
Randy Seeley, American medical academic
Randy Seiler (born 1946), American attorney
Randy J. Shams, American guitarist
Randy Shannon (born 1966), American football coach
Randy Sharp, American singer-songwriter
Randy Shilts (1951–1994), American journalist
Randy Shughart (1958–1993), American soldier
Randy Shumway (born 1971), American businessman
Randy Sidler (born 1956), American football player
Randy Simms, Canadian politician
Randy H. Skinner (born 1957), American consultant
Randy Skretvedt (born 1958), American film scholar
Randy Slaugh (born 1987), American music producer
Randy Smith (disambiguation), multiple people
Randy Smyth (born 1954), American sailor
Randy Snow (1959–2009), American tennis player
Randy Soderman (born 1974), American soccer player
Randy Sosin (born 1962), American film producer
Randy Souders (born 1954), American artist
Randy Sparks (born 1933), American musician
Randy Spears (born 1961), American pornographic actor
Randy Spelling (born 1978), American actor
Randy Spendlove, American record producer
Randy Spetman (born 1952), American athletic administrator
Randy Stageberg (born 1990), American gymnast
Randy Stair (1992–2017), American mass murderer
Randy Starkman (1960–2012), Canadian sports journalist
Randy Starks (born 1983), American football player
Randy Staten (born 1944), American politician and football player
Randy Staub, Canadian recording engineer
Randy St. Claire (born 1960), American baseball coach
Randy Steffes, Canadian musician
Randy Stein (1953–2011), American baseball player
Randy Sterling (born 1951), American baseball player
Randy Stevenson (born 1968), American political scientist
Randy Stewart (born 1951), American sports shooter
Randy Stoklos (born 1960), American beach volleyball player
Randy Stoll (born 1945), American basketball player
Randy Stoltmann (1962–1994), Canadian outdoorsman
Randy Stone (1958–2007), American actor
Randy Stonehill (born 1952), American singer-songwriter
Randy Stradley (born 1956), American writer
Randy Stuart (1924–1996), American actress
Randy Stufflebeam (born 1960), American political activist
Randy Stumpfhauser (born 1977), American motocross racer
Randy Suess (1945–2019), American software developer
Randy Swartzmiller (born 1960), American politician
Randy Sweeney (born 1956), American research scientist

T
Randy Tate (born 1965), American politician
Randy Tate (baseball) (1952–2021), American baseball player
Randy Terbush, American health executive
Randy Thom (born 1951), American sound designer
Randy Thomas (disambiguation), multiple people
Randy Thornhill (born 1944), American biologist
Randy Thornton (born 1964), American football player
Randy Thorsteinson (born 1956), Canadian politician
Randy Terrill (born 1969), American politician
Randy Tissot (born 1944), American stock car racing driver
Randy Tolsma (born 1966), American stock car racer
Randy Tomlin (born 1966), American baseball player
Randy Torres, American guitarist
Randy Trautman (1960–2014), American football player
Randy Travis (born 1959), American singer
Randy Tribble, American football coach
Randy Truitt, American politician
Randy Turnbull (born 1962), Canadian ice hockey player
Randy Turner (1949–2005), American singer
Randy Tyree (born 1940), American politician

V
Randy Valiente, Filipino comic book artist
Randy Vancourt, Canadian composer
Randy Van Divier (born 1958), American football player
Randy VanWarmer (1955–2004), American singer-songwriter
Randy Vasquez (born 1961), American actor
Randy Vataha (born 1948), American football player
Randy Velarde (born 1962), American baseball player
Randy Velischek (born 1962), Canadian ice hockey player
Randy Veres (1965–2016), American baseball player
Randy Vock (born 1994), Swiss wrestler

W
Randy Waldman (born 1955), American pianist
Randy Waldrum (born 1956), American soccer coach
Randy Walker (disambiguation), multiple people
Randy Watt (born 1957), American colonel
Randy Wayne (born 1981), American actor
Randy Weaver (born 1948), American army engineer
Randy Weber (born 1953), American businessman
Randy Weber (ski jumper) (born 1977), American ski jumper
Randy Weeks, American singer-songwriter
Randy Wells (born 1982), American baseball player
Randy West (disambiguation), multiple people
Randy Weston (1926–2018), American pianist
Randy Weston (politician), American politician
Randy White (disambiguation), multiple people
Randy Wicker (born 1938), American author
Randy Wiel (born 1951), Dutch basketball player
Randy Wigginton, American software developer
Randy Wiles (1951–2015), American baseball player
Randy Will (born 1964), American bobsledder
Randy Williams (born 1953), American athlete
Randy Williams (baseball) (born 1975), American baseball player
Randy Winkler (born 1943), American football player
Randy Winn (born 1974), American baseball player
Randy Wittman (born 1959), American basketball player and coach
Randy Woelfel, Canadian chemical executive
Randy Wolf (born 1976), American baseball player
Randy Wolters (born 1990), Dutch footballer
Randy Wood (disambiguation), multiple people
Randy Woods (born 1970), American basketball coach
Randy Woodson (born 1957), American academic administrator
Randy Woytowich (born 1954), Canadian curler
Randy Wright (born 1961), American football player
Randy Wyrozub (born 1950), Canadian ice hockey player

Y
Randy Young (born 1954), American football player
Randy Young (end) (1898–1975), American football player

Z
Randy Zisk, American television director

Fictional characters
Randy Bobandy, in the Canadian television series Trailer Park Boys
Randy Disher, in the show Monk
Randy Feltface, a puppet in various Australian television shows
Randy Robertson, in the series Marvel Comics
Randy Wagstaff, in the American television drama series The Wire
Randy Marsh, from South Park.

See also
Randall (disambiguation)
Randi
Randi (surname)

English-language masculine given names
English-language feminine given names
English-language unisex given names
Hypocorisms
English masculine given names
English feminine given names